Master Majibur Rahman is a Bangladesh Awami League politician and the former Member of Parliament of Shariatpur-1.

Career
Rahman was elected to parliament from Shariatpur-1 as a Bangladesh Awami League candidate in 1996 in an by-election. The by-election were called after Abdur Razzaq, who was elected from Shariatpur-1 and Shariatpur-3, resigned and choose to represent Shariatpur-3.

References

Awami League politicians
Living people
7th Jatiya Sangsad members
Year of birth missing (living people)